Caciomorpha batesi is a species of beetle in the family Cerambycidae. It was described by Francis Polkinghorne Pascoe in 1858.

References

Anisocerini
Beetles described in 1858